Chris Saunders-Griffiths (10 January 1929 – 12 July 2001) was a British field hockey player. Family members say that he was known as C.J.D Saunders-Griffiths and was always called John. He competed in the men's tournament at the 1960 Summer Olympics.

References

External links
 

1929 births
2001 deaths
British male field hockey players
Olympic field hockey players of Great Britain
Field hockey players at the 1960 Summer Olympics
Place of birth missing